Category A may refer to:

 Category A Listed building (Scotland)
 Category A Prison (UK)
 Category A Bioterrorism agent
 Category A services (Canada)
 A category of driving licence in the European Economic Area
 A category of driving licence in the United Kingdom
 The most serious category of disease recognized by the US Centers for Disease Control and Prevention